Dave Billes is a Canadian former Corvette racer before opening Performance Engineering Ltd. He was later Jacques Villeneuve (elder)'s car owner in CART IndyCar competition in the early 1980s, and entered two cars in the 1985 Indianapolis 500.

He was inducted into the Canadian Motorsport Hall of Fame in 1994.

Death: January 21,2023

IndyCar win

References

Living people
Year of birth missing (living people)
Racing drivers from Ontario